"The Altar" is a poem by the Welsh-born poet and Anglican priest George Herbert, first published in Herbert's collection The Temple. As an example of shaped poetry, its popularity in the 17th century is attested by several imitations and a musical setting.

Publication and shape
The Temple, the book in which the poem was first published, was only printed in 1633, after Herbert's death. "The Altar" is the first poem in the section titled The Church and, along with "Easter Wings", was one of two Baroque shaped poems there. The poem represents an altar in its shape on the page and is the second written by Herbert involving altars. The other is shorter and was originally written in Greek. This earlier poem provided a model for the later piece and has been referred to as a "meditation and a prayer". It does not resemble the English poem in shape, however.

The English poem's form was inspired by Classical (or "pagan") altars and the old Greek poems written to reflect their shapes. Publication of the Greek Anthology, in which such surviving poems appeared, first introduced English readers to the form in 1555.  Over the course of the poem's republication, the altar's shape has been altered to reflect later ecclesiastical attitudes rather than those at the time of The Temple's first printing. Some later editions also make the shaped intention clearer by drawing an outline around the text.

Content
Like most others in The Church section of The Temple, "The Altar" is a devotional poem. The three that preceded it had expressed didactic themes. Here the shorter and longer lines are arranged on the page in the shape of an altar and the visual appeal is reinforced by the Baroque conceit of its being constructed from the poet's stony heart to serve as "a broken Altar" that is "cemented with teares", on which he offers himself as a sacrifice. Built into this is an allusion to Psalm 51:17: "The sacrifices of God are a broken spirit; a broken and a contrite heart." In terms of the section's developing theme, the following poem is titled "The Sacrifice". However, that shifts the focus from the poet's personal devotion in "The Altar" by being written as a soliloquy of Jesus on the cross.

Beyond its emblematic function, "The Altar" inspired several explicitly ekphrastic poetic responses that were published later in the 17th century. The piece was also set to music then, most likely in an arrangement by John Playford.

References

External links
 The Altar

British poems
1633 poems